KAOX (107.9 FM) is a news/talk formatted radio station licensed to Shelley, Idaho. Known as "NewsTalk 107.9", the station is owned by Sandhill Media Group.

Overview
KAOX formerly broadcast from a tower located northeast of Kemmerer, and with its 13,500 watt signal, covered much of southwestern Wyoming. The station identified itself as "The X" and mentioned the towns of Evanston, Rock Springs, and Green River when it played its station identification.

KAOX had two sister stations KMER 940 AM, which is from Kemmerer, and KDWY 105.3 FM, which is licensed to Diamondville.

KAOX had satellite fed music from a network identifying itself as SAM, or Simply About Music. The format originated from Westwood One, an independent radio network. SAM is similar to the jockless format of Jack FM.

In Kemmerer, the station occasionally broadcast local high school football and basketball games. Prior to mid-2006, the station was locally programmed and music was not satellite fed as it is today. KAOX also broadcast ABC News at the top of each hour, followed by local weather.

External links

AOX
Radio stations established in 2000
News and talk radio stations in the United States
2000 establishments in Idaho